Animax Germany was an old German video on demand service and former television channel by Sony, a local version of Animax. It was launched during Summer 2007, the same year as its Eastern European counterpart. 

Animax has closed down on 1 October 2022 as VOD service, due to merger with Crunchyroll acquired along with Funimation and Wakanim.

References

External links 

 Animax Germany

2007 establishments in Germany
2016 disestablishments in Germany
Television stations in Germany
Defunct television channels in Germany
German-language television stations
Animax
Sony Pictures Television
Sony Pictures Entertainment
Television channels and stations established in 2007
Television channels and stations disestablished in 2016
Video on demand services